Until Dawn is a 2015 interactive drama horror video game developed by Supermassive Games and published by Sony Computer Entertainment for the PlayStation 4. Players assume control of eight young adults who have to survive on Blackwood Mountain when their lives are threatened. The game features a butterfly effect system in which players must make choices that may change the story. All playable characters can survive or die, depending on the choices made. Players explore the environment from a third-person perspective and find clues that may help solve the mystery.

The game was originally planned as a first-person game for the PlayStation 3's motion controller PlayStation Move. The motion controls were dropped when it became a PlayStation 4 game. The story was written by Larry Fessenden and Graham Reznick, who sought to create the video game equivalent of a slasher film. The development team took inspiration from various sources. These include the movies Evil Dead II and Poltergeist, and video games Heavy Rain, Resident Evil, and Silent Hill. To ensure the game was scary, the team used a galvanic skin response test to measure playtesters' fear levels when playing it. Jason Graves composed the soundtrack and Guerrilla Games' Decima game engine was used for the graphics. Several noted actors, including Rami Malek, Hayden Panettiere, Meaghan Martin, Brett Dalton, Jordan Fisher, Nichole Bloom, and Peter Stormare, provided motion capture and voice acting.

Until Dawn was announced at Gamescom 2012 and released in August 2015. Although there was little marketing effort from Sony, its sales surpassed expectations. The game received generally positive reviews, and was nominated for multiple year-end accolades. Critics praised the branching nature of the story, butterfly effect system, world building, characters, and use of quick time events, but criticised the controls. Supermassive followed the game with a virtual reality spin-off, Until Dawn: Rush of Blood (2016), and a prequel, The Inpatient (2018), while a spiritual successor, The Quarry, was released in 2022.

Gameplay

Until Dawn is an interactive drama in which players primarily assume control of eight young adults who have to survive on Blackwood Mountain until they are rescued at dawn. The gameplay is mainly a combination of cutscenes and third-person exploration. Players control the characters in a linear environment and find clues and items. Players can also collect totems, which give players a precognition of what may happen in the game's narrative. An in-game system keeps track of all of the story clues and secrets that players have discovered, even across multiple playthroughs. Action sequences feature mostly quick time events (QTE). One type of QTE involves hiding from a threat by holding the controller as still as possible when a "Don't Move" prompt appears.

The game features a butterfly effect system, in which players have to make choices. These range from small decisions like picking up a book to moral choices that involve the fates of other characters. Some decisions are timed. Certain choices may unlock a new sequence of events and cause unforeseen consequences. These choices also influence the story's tone and relationships between characters. Players can view the personality and details of the character they are controlling, and his or her relationships with other characters. All eight characters may die by the end of the story, depending on the player's decisions. Deaths are permanent; the game's narrative will adapt to these changes and continue forward without them. The strict auto-save system prevents players from reloading a previously saved file to prevent cheating. This makes it impossible to revert choices with unfavorable outcomes. The only ways to change the player's choice are to restart the game or to continue to the end and start a new game. There are hundreds of endings, which are the outcomes of 22 critical choices players can make in the game.

The game is divided into 10 chapters. There is an intermission between each chapter in which a psychiatrist, Dr. Hill (Peter Stormare), addresses the player directly (seemingly breaking the fourth wall). He analyses the player's fears along with choices they have made. Intermissions with narrators similar to Dr. Hill have since become a tradition with many other Supermassive Games horror games, continuing also with The Dark Pictures Anthology and The Quarry.

Plot

During a party at her lodge on Blackwood Mountain, a cruel prank causes Hannah Washington (Ella Lentini) to run into the woods. Hannah's twin sister Beth (also Lentini) finds her, but the two are pursued by a flamethrower-wielding stranger (Larry Fessenden), resulting in them falling off a cliff's edge. No bodies are found by the police and the sisters are declared missing.

A year later, Hannah and Beth's brother Josh (Rami Malek) invites the group from the previous partyHannah's friend Sam Giddings (Hayden Panettiere), Josh's friend Chris Hartley (Noah Fleiss), Chris' mutual love interest Ashley Brown (Galadriel Stineman), new couple Emily Davis (Nichole Sakura) and Matt Taylor (Jordan Fisher), Emily's ex-boyfriend Mike Munroe (Brett Dalton), and Mike's new girlfriend Jessica Riley (Meaghan Martin)back to the lodge. Despite tensions between members of the group and reservations about returning after the tragedy that occurred, all seven accept Josh's invitation. Each member of the group arrives at the lodge through a cable car before engaging in separate activities on the mountain.

As the night progresses, Mike and Jessica tryst at a guest cabin, where she is abducted by an unseen figure. Mike's pursuit of her attacker leads him to an abandoned sanatorium, which contains information about a 1952 cave-in on the mountain that trapped a group of miners. Mike will either find Jessica dead or alive, but the elevator she is found in will fall, convincing Mike she is dead. Meanwhile, Josh, Ashley, Chris, and Sam find themselves terrorized by a masked man in the lodge. Josh is bisected in a torture device set up by the masked man, who then pursues Sam through the building's lower levels. The masked man's torment of the friends culminates with Chris being ordered to shoot Ashley or himself under the threat of them both being killed by giant saw blades. Matt and Emily, having been alerted to the masked man's presence, discover that the cable car has been locked; instead, the two head to a radio tower to request help. The request is successfully received, but the responder states that the group will not be rescued until dawn due to a storm. An unknown creature causes the radio tower to collapse into the mines, separating Matt and Emily. Looking for a way out, Emily stumbles upon the location where Beth and Hannah fell, with Beth's severed head located nearby. She later is chased by the creature on her way out of the mines.

Mike reunites with Sam just as the masked man appears before them and Ashley and Chris. The masked man reveals himself as Josh, who orchestrated the events at the lodge as revenge for his sisters' presumed deaths. He disclaims any responsibility for Jessica's death, but Mike has him bound in a shed to remain until the police arrive. At the lodge, Sam, Mike, Chris, Ashley, and, if she escaped the mines, Emily are confronted by the Stranger. The Stranger reveals that the creatures who kidnapped Jessica and attacked Matt and Emily are wendigos, former humans who became feral creatures after resorting to cannibalism during the 1952 cave-in. Chris and the Stranger travel to the shed to rescue Josh, but discover him missing, and the Stranger and possibly Chris are killed by a wendigo while attempting to return to the lodge. While perusing the Stranger's files, if Emily was bitten in her escape, she will admit to it, and Mike may choose to kill her to avoid contagion. Finally, Mike sets out for the sanatorium, believing the cable car key to be in Josh's possession; the others scramble after him, with Ashley and Chris possibly falling victim to a wendigo trap en route.

Sam and Mike discover Josh in the mines; his weakened mental state has caused him to hallucinate his sisters and his psychiatrist Dr. Alan Hill (Peter Stormare). Mike tries to lead Josh to safety, but they are separated when Josh is attacked by the wendigo. He is slain outright unless Sam discovered enough clues to determine the truth: the lead wendigo is Hannah, who turned after consuming Beth's corpse. If Jessica and/or Matt are still alive, they link up and attempt to escape through the mines while evading Hannah. Finally, Mike and Sam return to the lodge to seek refuge in the basement with the rest of the survivors, only to find it overrun by wendigos, including Hannah. When a fight between the wendigos causes a gas leak, Mike and Sam work together to destroy the lodge, leading to an explosion that kills Hannah, the remaining wendigos, and possibly some of the survivors. Following the explosion, rescue helicopters arrive to retrieve whoever has survived until dawn.

In the ending credits, any surviving characters, excluding Josh, are interviewed by the police about the events on the mountain, where at least one of the characters will implore the police to search the mines. If he survives Hannah's attack, the trapped and isolated Josh turns to eating the Stranger's head and begins transforming into a wendigo.

Development and release

As a PlayStation Move game

British developer Supermassive Games led the game's development, which began in 2010. Its existence was revealed after a trademark for Until Dawn was discovered. The game's creative director was Will Byles, who joined the studio in the same year. The studio began discussing an idea for a new game for the PlayStation 3's PlayStation Move accessory, which had a greater emphasis on narrative than Supermassive's previous games, such as Start the Party!. The proposed game would be a horror game that resembled a slasher film and it would be designed for a younger audience that publisher Sony Computer Entertainment had courted with the Move. Supermassive hired American writers Larry Fessenden and Graham Reznick, both of whom had worked on horror movies, to write the game's script. They were hired because Byles felt the company's British writers wrote in a "parochial" way that is inappropriate for the horror genre.

The game was initially exclusive to PlayStation Move, meaning players needed to buy the Move controller to functionally play the game. In this version of the game, the only way to navigate and progress the game is by moving the motion controller. Moving the wand guides the movement of the flashlight held by the characters as players explore the location from a first-person perspective. The wand can also be used to interact with objects and solve puzzles. In this version of the game, players can occasionally wield a firearm.

A segment of the game shown at Gamescom 2012 received positive comments from the gaming community. Byles said the enthusiastic response was due to the game's unique tone, which was thought to be "fresh" compared with that of its competitors. One of the most common complaints received was the game's status as a Move exclusive; most people did not want to purchase a controller for the game. At that time, the game had reached the alpha development stage. Byles experimented with the game's debug camera and realized the potential of changing the perspective to third-person. This would change the game from a first-person adventure game to a more "cinematic" experience. The game also switched platform from PlayStation 3 to the PlayStation 4 and expanded the game's scope to include more mature content. Sony approved the idea and allowed the team to develop for the PS4 and changed the game's genre. According to Ashley Reed of GamesRadar, the changes in gameplay gave more "space to let the score, character personalities, camera work, and settings shine through". Most characters were also recast; Brett Dalton, one of the actors retained from the PlayStation 3 version, said he believed that the recasting was performed to hire better-known actors.

With these changes, the team partnered with Cubic Motion and 3Lateral to motion capture the actors' performances. The team also needed to change the game's graphics. They used the Decima engine created by Guerrilla Games and had to rework the lighting system. The team also extensively used particle effects and volumetric lighting to light up the game's environments. Despite the third-person perspective, the game adopted a static camera angle in a way similar to early Resident Evil games. The approach was initially resisted by the development team because the designers considered the camera "archaic". Byles and the game's production designer Lee Robinson, however, drew storyboards to ensure each camera angle had narrative motivations and prove their placements were not random. Initially, quality assurance testers were frustrated with the camera angle; Supermassive resolved this complaint by ensuring drastic camera transitions would not occur at thresholds like doors but the team had to remove some scenes to satisfy this design philosophy.

Gameplay and story
To increase the player's agency, the team envisioned a system named the "butterfly effect". Every choice the player makes in the game helps shape the story and ultimately leads to different endings. Byles stated that "all of [the characters] can live or all of whom can die in any order in any number of ways", and that this leads to many ways for scenes to unfold. He further added that no two players would get the same experience because certain scenes would be locked away should the player make a different choice. Byles said this would encourage players to replay the game to discover more about the story. The dynamic choice and consequence system was inspired by Quantic Dream's Heavy Rain. With a branching story, Supermassive developed software that recorded every choice in the game. Byles described the software as a series of "nodes" that enabled the team to keep track of the story they intended to tell. Due to the branching nature of the game, however, every time the team wanted to change details in the narrative, the writers needed to examine the possible impacts the change would have on subsequent events. The team avoided substantial rewrites and instead focused on adjusting the game's pacing and direction once the motion capture and shooting process had begun.

The game's strict auto-save system was designed to be "imperative" instead of "punitive". Byles said even though a character had died, the story would not end until it reached the ending and that some characters may not have died despite their deaths being hinted at. Some plot points were designed to be indirect and vague so the narrative would gradually unfold. Byles recognized the design choice as "risky" and that it may disappoint mainstream players but he felt it enhanced the game's "horror" elements. The game's pacing was inspired by that of Resident Evil and Silent Hill, in which there were quiet moments with no enemy encounter that help enhance the games' tension. Tom Heaton, the game's designer, said an unsuccessful QTE trial or one incorrect choice would not lead directly to a character's death, though it would send the characters to "harder, more treacherous paths".

Byles described the game as "glib" and "cheesy", and said the story and the atmosphere were similar to a typical teen horror movie. The film was inspired by a number of classic movies; the developers observed horror tropes and clichés that can be subverted in the game. These films included Psycho, The Haunting, The Exorcist, Halloween, Poltergeist, Evil Dead II, and The Conjuring. Fessenden and Reznick wrote a script of nearly 10,000 pages. The playable characters were set up as typical horror movie archetypes but as the narrative unfolded, these characters would show more nuanced qualities. The writers felt that, unlike films, games can use quieter moments for characters to express their inner feelings. With the game's emphasis on players' choices, players can no longer "laugh" at the characters' decisions because they must make these decisions themselves. It enables the player to relate with the characters and make each death more devastating. The dialogue was reduced significantly when the team began to use the motion capture technology, which facilitates storytelling through acting. The story was written in a non-linear fashion; chapter 8 was the first to be completed. This ended up causing some inconsistencies in the story.

The development team wanted to invoke fear in the player and ensure the game had the appropriate proportion of terror, horror, and disgust. Supermassive made most use of terror, which Byles defined as "the dread of an unseen threat". To ensure the game was scary enough, the team used a galvanic skin response test to measure playtesters' fear levels while they were playing the game. Byles described Until Dawn as a game that took "horror back to the roots of horror"; unlike many of its competitors, tension rather than action was emphasized.

Music

Jason Graves began working on Until Dawn music in 2011. The scoring process for three orchestra recording sessions lasted for one year. Graves talked with Barney Pratt, the game's audio director, for three hours to get a clear idea about the direction of the soundtrack. He first composed the game's main theme, which he felt represented what the team was trying to achieve, and used it as the demo pitch to Supermassive Games. The music was reactive; it would become louder as the player character approached a threat. While composing for the game, he mixed both melodic and atonal sounds together. The music was influenced by the work of Krzysztof Penderecki and Jerry Goldsmith. There were tonally vague themes to mirror the game's mysterious storyline.

With the butterfly effect being an important mechanic of the game, Graves used film music editing techniques. He divided each track into segments and had the orchestra play it piece by piece. He then manipulated the recordings and introduced variations of them in the recording studio. For the game's mountainous setting, he used a "goat-hoof shaker" to perform the mountain theme and many of the key tracks. He also extensively used synthesizers to pay homage to John Carpenter's work. Only 30 minutes of themes with melody and chord progression were recorded in three orchestral sessions. This was because most of the time was spent recording 8–10 hours' worth of atmospheric music and sounds that Graves later combined to invoke different emotions in different scenes. The Decima game engine was programmed to determine how the music was layered depending on players' choices in the game. The game's soundtracks were nearly 15 hours long. The theme song, "O Death", was performed by Amy Van Roekel.

Release and marketing
Until Dawn was officially announced at Gamescom 2012 and it was initially scheduled to be released in 2013 for PlayStation 3. After the game was retooled, it was rumored Sony had canceled it but Supermassive CEO Pete Samuels refuted the claim. The game was re-revealed at Gamescom 2014. Sony did not market Until Dawn extensively; most of its marketing effort was spent on promoting third-party games such as Destiny. On 31 July 2015, Sony confirmed the game had gone gold, indicating the team had completed development and it was being prepared for duplication and release. It was released for the PlayStation 4 in August 2015, two years after its initial proposed launch. Players who pre-ordered the game received a bonus mission featuring Matt and Emily. As well as the game's standard edition, an extended edition and a steelbook edition were available for purchase. The game's death scenes were censored in the Japanese version. Supermassive hosted a time-limited Halloween event in late October 2015, in which 11 pumpkins were added to the game as collectibles.

Reception

Critical response

Until Dawn received a generally positive reception based on 103 reviews, according to review aggregator Metacritic.

Jeff Marchiafava from Game Informer wrote that Supermassive Games had "polished the [adventure game] formula to a triple-A sheen". He also enjoyed the butterfly effect system because some choices significantly affect the game's narrative. Game Revolutions Jessica Vazquez described the system as a "welcome limitation" because players would not know the consequences of each choice until they reach the ending. Alexa Ray Corriea from GameSpot liked the game for its impactful choices and the "paranoia" it invokes during critical choices that risk the lives of certain characters. She also admired the system's complexity and intricacy, which lets the player replay the game to discover new scenes. Mollie L Patterson from Electronic Gaming Monthly thought that the system is a "fantastic" inclusion but it never reached its full potential. Chris Carter from Destructoid called the butterfly effect system "gimmicky" due to the choices not significantly influencing the plot. GamesRadar'''s Louise Blain opined that most choices players make in the first half of the game are meaningless, though she noted that this is less of a problem in the latter half. Polygons Phillip Kollar respected Supermassive's decision to not include manual saving, though he found the decision to be punitive because accidentally failing a QTE can result in a character's death.

Carter liked the game's world-building, which he said is extensive and intriguing. He also praised the cast's performances—singling out Peter Stormare's performance as therapist Dr. Hill—and the intermission sessions that became increasingly disturbing as the game progressed. Ray Corriea also enjoyed the cast's performances along with Graves' soundtracks, which she said elevate the game's "panic, terror, and anguish". On a less positive note, Kollar wrote that the acting is hampered by inadequacies in the game's motion capture technology. Marchiafava enjoyed the "compelling" story; he applauded the developers for successfully using different horror tropes while introducing several twists to the formula. Both Marchiafava and Dean Takahashi from Venturebeat liked the characters, who show genuine growth as the narrative unfolds. Correa added that players can relate to these characters. Both Blain and Patterson called the game a "love letter" to horror films, with Patterson noting the game's similarities to a "B-grade teen slasher flick". Andrew Webster from The Verge agreed, saying the game combines elements of both horror films and games, and transforms them into a "terrifying experience". He further added that the control the player has over the events makes Until Dawn "something special". Lucy O'Brien from IGN, however, said the game's strict adherence to genre tropes dilutes the game's scary moments and that it "revels in the slasher genre's idiosyncratic idiocy". She also criticized the game's inconsistent tone. Kollar disliked the game's writing and he criticized the "awkward cuts, long moments of unintentionally hilarious silence and hopping between scenes and perspectives with no regard for holding the player's interest".

Carter called the gameplay of Until Dawn unimaginative, though critics generally agreed the quick time events are well-handled because they help players become immersed in the game; Ray Corriea chose the "Don't Move" prompt as one of the player inputs that further heighten the tension. Marchiafava called its use one of the best in gaming because button prompts were often timed and successful attempts required precision. Patterson described the gameplay as conventional; he enjoyed the inclusion of QTEs and said they match with the game's overall theme and atmosphere. He noted, however, the game's cumbersome controls and suggested the shortcoming may originate from the game's origin as a PlayStation Move exclusive. Ray Corriea was disappointed by the game's linearity and the lack of interactions players can have with the environments, which she said had wasted the game's setting. Blain praised the game's quieter moments, in which the player character simply walks and explores the environment, and the fixed camera angles that contribute to tense and frightening moments. Takahashi found the 3D navigation awkward. O'Brien lamented the game's poorly-implemented motion control; she also disliked the QTEs, which she considered as tedious at times. Level design and location diversity were commonly praised by critics. The collectibles were regarded as meaningful additions to the game because they give players insights into possible future events in the game.

Sales
According to Chart-Track, Until Dawn was the second-best-selling retail game in the UK in its week of release, trailing only Gears of War: Ultimate Edition. It was also the seventh-best-selling game in the US and the top-trending game on YouTube in August 2015. Sony was surprised by the game's critical responses and the number of players posting videos of it or streaming it on YouTube. Shuhei Yoshida, President of SCE Worldwide Studios, called Until Dawn a "sleeper hit". Samuels added that the game surpassed the company's expectations, though the exact sales figure was not announced.

Accolades

Spin-off and prequel
Sony announced a non-canonical spin-off, Until Dawn: Rush of Blood, at Paris Games Week 2015. The company described it as an arcade shooter. Its development began halfway through Until Dawns development. Until Dawn: Rush of Blood was released on the PlayStation VR on 13 October 2016. In June 2017, a prequel to Until Dawn, The Inpatient, was announced. It is set in the Blackwood Sanatorium sixty years before the original.

See also
 The Quarry'' (2022), a spiritual successor also developed by Supermassive Games

References

External links

 

2015 video games
Cancelled PlayStation 3 games
Decima (game engine) games
2010s horror video games
Interactive movie video games
PlayStation 4 games
PlayStation 4-only games
Single-player video games
Sony Interactive Entertainment games
Sony Interactive Entertainment franchises
Video games scored by Jason Graves
Video games developed in the United Kingdom
Video games featuring female protagonists
Video games set in 2014
Video games set in 2015
Video games set in Canada
Video games set in psychiatric hospitals
Video games with alternate endings
Supermassive Games
Video games about cannibalism
Video games set in forests
Video games using Havok
Wendigos in popular culture
Weird fiction video games
Permadeath games
BAFTA winners (video games)